Roy Michael "Hog" Roberts (December 18, 1952 – March 10, 1999) was executed in Missouri by lethal injection at the Potosi Correctional Center, for assisting the murder of a correctional officer named Tom Jackson in Missouri's Moberly Correctional Center in July 1983.

A 2005 investigation was opened to investigate the possibility of Roberts' innocence. No physical evidence connected Roberts to the crime. Four eyewitnesses, including three corrections officers, testified that Roberts had participated in the murder, while nine witnesses, including another corrections officer, had testified that Roberts had been elsewhere at the moment of the stabbing.

See also
 Capital punishment in Missouri
 Capital punishment in the United States
 List of people executed in Missouri

References

General references
State of Missouri v. Roy Roberts. The Missourinet. Retrieved on 2007-11-15.
Death Row - Capital Punishment in Missouri - Executions: 1989-2005. The Missourinet. Retrieved on 2007-11-18.

1952 births
1999 deaths
American people convicted of murder
People executed for murder
20th-century executions of American people
20th-century executions by Missouri
People executed by Missouri by lethal injection
People convicted of murder by Missouri